Trofej Umag (also known as the Umag Trophy) is a men's one-day cycle race, which takes place in Croatia and is rated by the UCI as 1.2 and forms part of the UCI Europe Tour.

Overall winners

References

Cycle races in Croatia
2013 establishments in Croatia
Recurring sporting events established in 2013
Sport in Istria County
Spring (season) events in Croatia
UCI Europe Tour races